This is a list of the rulers of the Iraqi city of Mosul.

Umayyad governors

 Muhammad ibn Marwan (ca. 685–705)
 Yusuf ibn Yahya ibn al-Hakam (ca. 685–705)
 Sa'id ibn Abd al-Malik (ca. 685–705)
 Yahya ibn Yahya al-Ghassani (719–720)
 Marwan ibn Muhammad ibn Marwan (720–724)
 Al-Hurr ibn Yusuf (727–731/32)
 Yahya ibn al-Hurr (732/33)
 Al-Walid ibn Talid (733–739)
 Abu Quhafa ibn al-Walid (739–743)
 Al Qatiran  ibn Akmad ibn al-Shaybani (744–745)
 Hisham ibn Amr-al Zubayr (745–750)

Abbasid governors

 Muhammad ibn Sawl (750–751)
 Yahya ibn Muhammad ibn Ali (c. 751)
 Ismail ibn  Ali ibn Abdullah (751–759)
 Malik ibn al-Haytham al-Khuzai (759–762)
 Ja'far ibn Abu Jafar (762–764)
 Khalid ibn Barmak (764–766)
 Ismail ibn Abd Allah ibn Yazid (768–770)
 Yazid ibn Usayd ibn Zafir al-Sulami (770)
 Musa ibn Ka'b (771–772)
 Khalid ibn Barmak and Musa ibn Mus'ab (772–775)
 Ishaq ibn Sulayman al-Hashimi (776)
 Hassan al Sarawi (776–777)
 Abd al-Samad ibn Ali (778)
 Muhammed ibn al-Fadl (779–780)
 Ahmad ibn Ismail ibn Ali (781–782)
 Musa ibn Mus'ab (782–783)
 Hashim ibn Sa'id (785)
 Abd al-Malik ibn Salih (785–787)
 Ishaq ibn Muhammed (787–778)
 Saíd ibn al-Salm (778–789)
 Abd Allah ibn Malik (789–791)
 al-Hakam ibn Sulayman (791)
 Muhammed ibn al-Abbas al-Hashimi (791–796)
 Yahya ibn Sa'id al-Harazi (796–797)
 Harthama ibn A'yan (798–802), with various deputies
 Nadal ibn Rifa's (804–805)
 Khalid  ibn Yazid ibn Hatim (806)
 Ali ibn Sadaqa ibn Dinar (c. 806)
 Muhammed ibn al-Fadl (806–809)
 Ibrahim ibn al-Abbas (809)
 Khalid  ibn Yazid (810)
 al-Muttalib ibn Abd Allah (811)
 al-Hasan  ibn Umar (812)
 Tahir ibn Husayn (813)
 Ali ibn al-Hasan ibn Sailh (814–817)
 al-Sayyid ibn Anas (817–826)
  Muhammed ibn Humayd al-Tusi (826–827)
  Harun ibn Abu Khalid (827)
  Muhammed ibn al-Sayyid ibn Anas (827–828)
 Malik ibn Tawk (829–831)
  Mansur ibn Bassam (c.834)
  Abd Allah ibn al-Sayyid ibn Anas (c. 838)
 Akaba ibn Muhammad (before 868)
 Hasan ibn Ayyub (before 868)
 Abd Allah ibn Sulayman (c. 868)
 Musawir: Kharijite rebel (868)
 Azugitin (873–874), with deputies
 Khidr bin Ahmad (c. 874)
 Autonomous:
 Ishaq ibn Kundaj (879–891)
 Muhammad ibn Ishaq ibn Kundaj (891–892)
 Ahmad ibn Isa al-Shaybani (892–893)
 Hamdan ibn Hamdun, rebel Hamdanid (892–895)
 Direct Abbasid control
 Hasan  ibn Ali  (c. 895) 
 Abu Muhammad Ali ibn al-Mu'tadid (c. 899–902)

Hamdanid emirs

 Abdallah Abu'l-Hayja ibn Hamdan, 905–913, 914–916 926–929, as Abbasid governor
 Nasir al-Dawla, 929–930 and 935–967 
 Sa'id ibn Hamdan, 931–934
 Abu Taghlib, 967–978
 Directly administered as part of the Buyid emirate of Iraq, 978–989
 Abu Tahir Ibrahim and Abu Abdallah Husayn, 989–990

Uqaylid emirs

 Muhammad ibn al-Musayyab ca. 990–991/2
 Abu Ja'far al-Hajjaj (Buyid governor) 991/2–996
 Al-Muqallad ibn al-Musayyab 996–1001
 Qirwash ibn al-Muqallad 1001–1050
 Baraka ibn al-Muqallad 1050–1052 
 Quraysh ibn Baraka 1052–1061 
 Under Seljuk suzerainty 1055–1096
 Muslim ibn Quraysh 1061–1085 
 Ibrahim ibn Quraysh 1085–1089/90
 Fakhr al-Dawla ibn Jahir (vizier of Malik-Shah I) 1089/90–1092
 Ali ibn Muslim 1092
 Ibrahim ibn Quraysh 1092–1093
 Ali ibn Muslim 1093–1096

Seljuk Atabegs

 Kerbogha, 1096–1102 
 Sunqurjah, officer of Kerbogha, 1102.
 Musa al-Turkomani, Kerbogha's deputy at Hisn Kaifa, 1102.
 Jikirmish 1102–1106 
 Jawali Saqawa, 1106–1109  
 Mawdud, 1109–1113
 Aqsunqur al-Bursuqi, 1113–1114
 Juyûsh-Beg, 1114–1124
Aqsunqur al-Bursuqi, second rule, 1124–1126
 Mas’ûd ibn Bursuqî, son of Aqsunqur al-Bursuqi, 1126–1127.

Zengid emirs

 [Under Seljuk sovereignty]
 Imad al-Din Zengi 1127–1146
 Saif ad-Din Ghazi I 1146–1149 
 Qutb ad-Din Mawdud 1149–1169
 Ghazi II Saif ud-Din 1169–1180 
 Mas'ud I 'Izz ud-Din 1180–1193 and:
 Sanjar Shah (at Jazira) 1176–1208 and: 
 Arslan I Shah Nur ud-Din 1193–1211 and: 
 Mahmud Muizz ad-Din (at Jazira) 1208–1241 and: 
 Mas'ud II 'Izz ud-Din 1211–1218 and afterwards:
 Arslan II Shah Nur ud-Din 1218–1219 and afterwards:
 Nasir ad-Din Mahmud 1219–1234.

Lu'lu'id emirs
 Badr al-Din Lu'lu', former atabeg to Nasir ad-Din Mahmud, 1234–1259
 [Under Mongols suzerainty beginning in 1254]
 As-Salih Isma'il, son of Badr al-Din Lu'lu', in Mosul and Sinjar, 1259–1262
 Al-Muzaffar 'Ala' al-Din 'Ali, son of Badr al-Din Lu'lu', in Sinjar, 1259
 Sayf al-Din Ishāq, son of Badr al-Din Lu'lu', in Jazirat ibn 'Umar, 1259-1262.

Mongol Governors

 Mulay Noyan c. 1296–1312
 Amīr Sūtāy 1312–1331/1332, Sutayid
 Alī Pādshāh, Oirat 1332–1336
 Ḥājī Ṭaghāy ibn Sūtāy 1336–c. 1342, Sutayid
 Ibrahim Shah 1342–1347, Sutayid, nephew of Ḥājī Ṭaghāy
 To the house of Jalayirid of Baghdad 1340s–1383

Jalayirid

 Bayazid 1382–1383
 To the Horde of the Black Sheep 1383–1401
 To the Timurid Empire 1401–1405
 To the Horde of the Black Sheep 1405–1468
 To the Horde of the White Sheep 1468–1508
 To Persia 1508–1534
 To the Ottoman Empire 1534–1623
 To Persia 1623–1638
 To the Ottoman Empire 1638–1917

Ottoman governors

 Ezidi Mirza (1649-1650)
 Hatibzade Yahya Pasha (1748)
 Hüseyin Pasha 1758–?
 Murad Pasha ?
 Sa'dullah Pasha ?
 Hasan Pasha of Mosul ?
 Mehmed Pasha of Mosul ?
 Süleyman Pasha ?
 Mehmed Amin Pasha ?
 Mahmud Pasha ?
 Abdurrahman Pasha ?
 Ahmed Pasha ?
 Osman Pasha ?
 Naman Pasha ?–1831
 Omari Pasha 1831–1833
 Yahya Pasha 1833–1834
 Injal Pasha 1835–1840
 ? 1840–1844
 Sherif Pasha 1844–1845
 Tayyar Pasha 1846
 Esad Pasha 1847
 Vechihi Pasha 1848 
 Kâmil Pasha 1848–1855
 Within the eyalet of Van 1855–1865
 Within the vilayet of Iraq 1865–1875 
 ? 1875–1889
 Kürd Reshid Pasha 1889
 ? 1889–1894
 Aziz Pasha 1894–1895 
 Kölemen Abdullah Pasha 1896 
 Zihdi Bey 1897
 Abdülwahib Pasha 1898
 Hüseyin Hazim Pasha 1898–1900 
 Hadji Reshid Pasha 1901
 Nuri Pasha 1902–1904 
 Mustafa Bey 1905–1908 
 Fazil Pasha 1909
 Tahir Pasha 1910–1912
 Süleyman Nasif Bey 1913–1916 
 Haydar Bey 1916–1918

References

Mosul
 
Mosul
Governors of Mosul